Elections to the French National Assembly were held in Senegal on 12 August 1849 as part of the wider French elections. Incumbent MP Barthélémy Durand Valantin was re-elected with 65% of the vote.

Electoral system
The single Senegalese seat in the National Assembly was created by decree on 5 March 1848. Following an order of 5 November 1830 and a law of 24 April 1833, all free-born people and freed slaves in Senegal had full civic and political rights, the only French African colony to give such rights until the end of World War II. The right to vote was given to all men over the age of 25 and who could prove they had lived in their municipality for the previous five years. In total 4,991 men registered to vote, up from 4,706 in the 1848 elections.

Results

Aftermath
Valantin retired from politics in 1851, but before a by-election could be held, a decree of 2 February 1852 abolished Senegalese representation in the National Assembly.

References

Senegal
1849 in Senegal
Elections in Senegal